Mamiyarum Oru Veetu Marumagale is a 1961 Indian Tamil-language film comedy drama film directed by K. B. Tilak. The film stars S. S. Rajendran and M. N. Rajam. It is a remake of the director's own Telugu film Atha Okinti Kodale. The film was released on 27 April 1961.

Plot

Cast 
The list is adapted from the book Thiraikalanjiyam Part 2.

Male cast
S. S. Rajendran
K. Balaji
V. K. Ramasamy
S. V. Subbaiah
Sayeeram

Female cast
M. N. Rajam
Devika
M. Saroja
C. K. Saraswathi
S. N. Lakshmi

Production 
The film was produced by D. V. Rao, K. Balaramaiah and K. B. Tilak under the banner Anupama Films. K. B. Tilak directed the film while the screenplay and dialogues were penned by Udhayakumar. The film was remade from the Telugu film Atha Okinti Kodale by the same director.

Soundtrack 
Music was scored by Pendyala Nageswara Rao while the lyrics were penned by A. Maruthakasi.

References

External links 
 

1960s Tamil-language films
1961 comedy-drama films
Films directed by K. B. Tilak
Films scored by Pendyala Nageswara Rao
Indian comedy-drama films
Tamil remakes of Telugu films